State Road Bridge is a covered bridge spanning Conneaut Creek in Monroe Township, Ashtabula County, Ohio, United States. The bridge, one of currently 17 drivable bridges in the county, is a single span Town truss design. The dedication of the bridge in 1983 was the forerunner of the Ashtabula County Covered Bridge Festival.

State Road Bridge is not to be confused with a covered bridge on another State Road in the county, Smolen-Gulf Bridge.

History
1983 – Bridge constructed.
The original covered bridge was built in 1831, by Ira Benton, and David Niles, for a cost of $100. The bridge stood until 1898.

Dimensions
Span: 
Length: 
Width: 
Height:

Gallery

See also
List of Ashtabula County covered bridges

References

External links
Ohio Covered Bridges List
Ohio Covered Bridge Homepage
The Covered Bridge Numbering System
Ohio Historic Bridge Association
State Road Covered Bridge from Ohio Covered Bridges, Historic Bridges

Covered bridges in Ashtabula County, Ohio
Bridges completed in 1983
Road bridges in Ohio
Wooden bridges in Ohio
Lattice truss bridges in the United States